Villager may refer to:

 A person from a village

Newspapers
 The Villager (Austin, Texas), a free weekly newspaper of Austin, Texas, serving the African-American community
 The Villager, a weekly newspaper in Namibia
 The Villager (Saint Paul, Minnesota), a community newspaper in Saint Paul, Minnesota, United States
 The Villager (Manhattan), a newspaper in Manhattan, New York, United States
 The Villager (The Woodlands, Texas), a newspaper in The Woodlands, Texas, United States

Entertainment
 Villagers (band), an Irish band from Dún Laoghaire
 The Villagers, a 2018 South Korean action thriller film

Fictional characters
 Villager (Animal Crossing), playable characters in Animal Crossing
 NPC Villager, a character found in villages in Minecraft

Other uses
 Mercury Villager, a car model
 Edsel Villager, an older car model
 Villager, a defunct motel chain owned by Cendant which was merged into Knights Inn in 2004
 Villager Football Club, a rugby club in Cape Town, South Africa

See also

 The Village (disambiguation)